Cornelius Cyprian Henry (born 16 September 1956) is a Canadian cricketer and rugby union player. He played in the 1979 Cricket World Cup where he took two wickets against Australia. He then played rugby for Canada in the 1980s and cricket in the Ottawa Valley Cricket Council for Bel Air CC.

References

External links
 

1956 births
Living people
Canadian cricketers
Canada One Day International cricketers
Canadian rugby union players
Saint Lucian emigrants to Canada
Saint Lucian cricketers